is a 1996 Japanese erotic thriller film directed by Keiichirō Yoshida. The film stars Makiko Kuno.

Cast
 Makiko Kuno
 Takeshi Yamato
 Kenichi Endō
 Ren Osugi
 Teppei Shibuya
 Taisaku Akino
 Hitomi Shiraishi
 Kanpei Hazama
 Kasae Umetsu
 Ryuji Katagiri
 Shohei Hino

See also 
XX: Beautiful Hunter

External links
 "マリーの獲物 (1996)]" (in Japanese). allcinema.net. Retrieved 2010-08-23.
 "マリーの獲物" (in Japanese). Japanese Cinema Database (Agency for Cultural Affairs). Retrieved 2010-08-23.
 "マリーの獲物" (in Japanese). Japanese Movie Database. Retrieved 2010-08-23.
 "マリーの獲物" (in Japanese). Kinema Junpo. Retrieved 2010-08-23.
 "マリーの獲物" (in Japanese). www.walkerplus.com. Retrieved 2010-08-23.

1996 films
1990s erotic thriller films
Films shot in Japan
Japanese erotic thriller films
1990s action films
Girls with guns films
1990s Japanese films